The discography of Pharrell Williams, an American recording artist and record producer, consists of two studio albums, two extended plays (EPs), one mixtape, 21 singles (including 50 as a featured artist).

On September 9, 2005, Williams performed the opening single from his first solo album In My Mind, "Can I Have It Like That" ;featuring Gwen Stefani). The single did poorly in the US, reaching only number 48. It fared better in the UK, reaching number three. Between then and the July 25, 2006 release of "In My Mind", he released "Angel" (in Europe only), and later "Number One" (featuring Kanye West). "That Girl" (featuring Snoop Dogg) was the final single.

In 2013, Williams featured on Daft Punk's fourth studio album Random Access Memories on the songs "Get Lucky" and "Lose Yourself to Dance". In addition, Williams contributed to Azealia Banks' debut studio album Broke with Expensive Taste, featuring on the song "ATM Jam", though it was taken out of the album prior to release. Williams penned three new original songs, included alongside composer Heitor Pereira's score, for the sequel Despicable Me 2. These were "Just a Cloud Away", "Happy", and "Scream" (featuring CeeLo Green). His two original songs from the first film were also reprised on the soundtrack - "Despicable Me" and "Fun, Fun, Fun". In March 2013, Williams appeared alongside T.I. on Robin Thicke's hit single "Blurred Lines". The song has been a worldwide hit, has peaked at number one on the Billboard Hot 100, and has also reached number one in 13 more countries including the United Kingdom and Germany, making it Williams' third Billboard Hot 100 number one single. On June 29, 2013, he became the 12th artist in the chart's history to simultaneously hold the number one and two positions (with "Blurred Lines" and "Get Lucky", respectively). By July 2013, only 137 singles in UK chart history had achieved one million sales in the UK - that month Williams scored two million-sellers with "Get Lucky" and "Blurred Lines".

In November 2013, Williams released the first 24-hour music video to his Despicable Me 2 collaboration song, "Happy". Guest appearances included Magic Johnson, Steve Carell, Jimmy Kimmel, Jamie Foxx, Steve Martin, Odd Future, Miranda Cosgrove, Janelle Monáe, and many others. In December 2013, a press release from Columbia Records announced that Williams had signed a contract with the label and would be releasing an album in 2014, featuring the single "Happy" from the Despicable Me 2 soundtrack. "Happy" has since become one of the best-selling singles of all time, having sold more than 10 million copies worldwide. It is also the most downloaded song in the United Kingdom, with over 1.65 million copies sold. On March 4, 2014, Williams released his second studio album Girl, which includes the singles "Happy", "Marilyn Monroe", "Come Get It Bae" and "Gust of Wind".

Albums

Solo studio albums

Mixtapes

Singles

As lead artist

As featured artist

Other charted songs

Other guest appearances

See also
Pharrell Williams production discography
N.E.R.D. discography
Child Rebel Soldier discography
The Neptunes production discography

Notes

References

External links
 [ Chart history] on Billboard

The Neptunes
Discographies of American artists
Hip hop discographies
Pop music discographies
Rhythm and blues discographies
Discography